Branka Bagarić (born 9 November 1998) is a Bosnia and Herzegovina footballer who plays as a midfielder for Women's Premier League club ŽNK Fortuna Živinice and the Bosnia and Herzegovina women's national team.

Club career
Bagarić has played for ŽNK Široki Brijeg in Bosnia and Herzegovina.

International career
Bagarić capped for Bosnia and Herzegovina at senior level during the UEFA Women's Euro 2017 qualifying.

References

1995 births
Living people
Bosnia and Herzegovina women's footballers
Women's association football midfielders
Bosnia and Herzegovina women's international footballers